Amalgamated Housing Cooperative, originally the Amalgamated Cooperative Apartment House, is a pioneering American limited-equity cooperative apartment complex organized under the provisions of the Private Housing Finance (PVH) law, article IV (unlike the Mitchell-Lama housing under PVH, art. II) and originally built from 1927 to 1930 in The Bronx, New York City, New York.

The Amalgamated Clothing Workers of America, headed by Sidney Hillman and prodded by Cooperative housing founder Abraham E. Kazan, funded and organized the construction of a community of affordable housing for the working class. It was designed by the architectural team that included Herman Jessor, the man who ultimately designed the bulk of the housing cooperatives that went up between 1930–1975. It was the first cooperative housing complex in the United States founded under the limited equity rules. The undertaking was such a success, that it spawned over 40,000 more units to crop up around New York City. Amalgamated Housing grew from original 300 to almost 1500 apartments by 2007. The newest tower building was completed in 1971.

See also 
 United Workers Cooperatives (Allerton Coops)
 Cooperative Village
 Penn South
 Co-Op City

References

External links 
 
 Robie, Alexis. "Lex's Folly: Union Forever", November 17, 2004 10:30 AM 
 Hans, Alexandra Vozick. "Amalgamated Housing: The History of a Pioneer Co-Operative 1927 Bronx, New York", LesOnline.com, March 2006 - July 2007
At Home in Utopia documentary on housing cooperatives in the Bronx highlighting the Coops with footage of the Amalgamated; broadcast on PBS, 2009
 MCNY Blog: New York Stories: Affordable New York: Amalgamated Housing Cooperative
 https://www.nytimes.com/2013/02/17/realestate/van-cortlandt-village-the-bronx-affordable-homes-and-price-of-place.html New York Times]: Affordability, and Pride of Place
 https://www.placematters.net/node/995 Place Matters]: Amalgamated Housing Cooperative

Condominiums and housing cooperatives in the Bronx
Kingsbridge Heights, Bronx
Residential buildings in the Bronx